In the context of secrecy laws, a public interest defence is a defence that allows a defendant who disclosed classified or protected information to avoid criminality by establishing that the public interest in disclosure of the information outweighs the public interest in nondisclosure. It is aimed at protecting whistleblowers of government misconduct. 

The inclusion of the defence was a subject of debate in the legislative process of the Official Secrets Act 1989 of the United Kingdom. The defence was not included in the final Act. The defence was also absent in secrecy laws in other countries that were based on the Act. 

Canada has reformed its secrecy laws in 2001 by adding the defence in its Security of Information Act. However, its application is limited to situations in which the defendant has followed a series of steps set out in the legislation before making the disclosure, and the person's purpose in making the disclosure is to reveal an offence committed by another person in their official duties.

The inclusion of the defence has been a subject of debate in Hong Kong in 2003 during its legislative process to implement Article 23 of the Basic Law in the media in Hong Kong.

The US does not have a public interest defence. Edward Snowden, a NSA contractor who leaked classified documents in the public interest, said he will return to the US and stand trial if he is allowed a public interest defence. Snowden has been living abroad since 2013.

References

External links
 HKSAR Government's view on the public interest defence

Criminal defenses
Canadian criminal law
Criminal law of the United Kingdom
Interest defence